The 1990 African Cup of Nations was an international football tournament held in Algeria from 2 to 16 March. Eight national teams where involved in this competition, below are their squads.

Group A

Algeria
Coach: Abdelhamid Kermali

|-----
! colspan="6" bgcolor="#B0D3FB" align="left" |
|----- bgcolor="#DFEDFD"

|-----
! colspan="6" bgcolor="#B0D3FB" align="left" |
|----- bgcolor="#DFEDFD"

|-----
! colspan="6" bgcolor="#B0D3FB" align="left" |
|----- bgcolor="#DFEDFD"

*Rachid Adghigh seriously injured after the 2nd match, Algeria decided to replace him with Messaoud Aït Abderrahmane

Egypt
Coach: Hany Moustapha

Ivory Coast
Coach:  Radivoje Ognjanović

Nigeria
Coach:  Clemens Westerhof

Group B

Cameroon
Coach:  Valery Nepomnyashchy

Kenya
Coach: Mohammed Kheri

Senegal
Coach:  Claude Le Roy

Zambia
Coach: Samuel Ndhlovu

|

References
FIFA
RSSSF
RSSSF – Final Tournament Details
DZFoot
EgyptianFootball

Africa Cup of Nations squads
1990 African Cup of Nations